John Garrett Penn (March 19, 1932 – September 9, 2007) was a United States district judge of the United States District Court for the District of Columbia.

Education and career
Born in Pittsfield, Massachusetts, Penn's father was a machinist. Penn attended the Woodrow Wilson School of Public and International Affairs at Princeton University and received an Artium Baccalaureus degree from the University of Massachusetts Amherst in 1954. Initially, Penn was a chemistry major but chose to concentrate on law due to the civil rights movement. He then earned a Bachelor of Laws from Boston University School of Law in 1957. He served on the United States Army Judge Advocate General's Corps from 1958 to 1961 and achieved the rank of first lieutenant. In 1961, Penn joined the tax division of the United States Department of Justice, becoming assistant chief of the division's general litigation section. He also served as a trial attorney from 1961 to 1965 and a reviewer from 1965 to 1968. Penn served as a judge of the District of Columbia Court of General Sessions from 1970 to 1971. He served as an associate judge of the Superior Court of the District of Columbia from 1971 to 1979.

Federal judicial service

Penn was nominated by President Jimmy Carter on January 19, 1979, to a seat on the United States District Court for the District of Columbia which had been vacated by Judge Joseph Cornelius Waddy. He was confirmed by the United States Senate on March 21, 1979, and received his commission on March 23, 1979. He served as Chief Judge from 1992 to 1997. He assumed senior status on March 31, 1998. Penn served in that capacity until his death on September 9, 2007, in Washington, D.C.

See also 
 List of African-American federal judges
 List of African-American jurists

References

Sources
 

1932 births
2007 deaths
African-American judges
Boston University School of Law alumni
Judges of the United States District Court for the District of Columbia
Superior court judges in the United States
United States district court judges appointed by Jimmy Carter
20th-century American judges
United States Army officers
University of Massachusetts Amherst alumni
Princeton School of Public and International Affairs alumni
United States Department of Justice lawyers
Judges of the Superior Court of the District of Columbia
United States Army Judge Advocate General's Corps